Gearhart Mountain is a  high mountain in Lake County and Klamath County, Oregon, in the United States. It is located in the Gearhart Mountain Wilderness of the Fremont–Winema National Forest, northeast of the Sprague River valley and the town of Bly.

See also
List of mountain peaks of Oregon

References

Mountains of Klamath County, Oregon
Mountains of Lake County, Oregon
North American 2000 m summits